University of Virginia Cancer Center is a National Cancer Institute-designated Comprehensive Cancer Center affiliated with the University of Virginia School of Medicine and the UVA Health System. 

Focused on research and education, UVA Cancer Center has more than 175 member faculty researchers supported by approximately $75 million in annual funding. The center also conducts regional outreach to improve awareness of cancer risks and access to screening and treatment.

UVA Cancer Center is one of 53 comprehensive centers designated by the NCI, and the only one in Virginia.

History 
The University of Virginia Cancer Center was founded in 1984 and has been NCI-designated since 1987. This status is reviewed every five years. Its comprehensive designation became effective February 1, 2022.

The center's director, Thomas P. Loughran Jr., discovered and is considered a leading expert in large granular lymphocytic (LGL) leukemia. He succeeded Michael J. Weber, who stepped down in 2013 after twelve years of service.

UVA Cancer Center is funded as a partner in the federal Cancer Moonshot. The initiative is led by the Biden Administration and in 2022 set new goals of reducing the cancer death rate by half within 25 years while improving the lives of people with cancer and survivors. 

UVA Cancer Center is accredited by the Foundation for the Accreditation of Cellular Therapy (FACT). It is a leader in treatment of  myelodysplastic syndrome and an MDS Foundation Center of Excellence.

Research 
The UVA Cancer Center’s member researchers represent UVA’s schools of Medicine, Nursing, Engineering and Applied Science, Education, Data Science, and the College of Arts and Sciences. Its primary research is divided into four collaborative, transdisciplinary programs:
 Cancer Biology
 Molecular Genetics and Epigenetics
 Cancer Therapeutics
 Cancer Prevention and Population Health

The UVA Cancer Center is a leader in research and treatment of rare blood cancers and in research and development of focused ultrasound for cancer treatment. The center is affiliated with UVA’s Translational Orphan Blood Cancer Research Initiative, which pursues new therapies for rare cancers that lack the funding afforded more common cancers, and with the School of Medicine’s Focused Ultrasound Cancer Immunotherapy Center.

UVA Cancer Center’s research findings include:

 Discovery of the gene responsible for glioblastoma, the deadliest form of brain cancer. UVA researchers also found that the same gene factors in two forms of the childhood cancer rhabdomyosarcoma.
 Identification of a gene contributing to small-cell lung cancer, that when manipulated halted the disease’s spread in mice
 Discovery of link between the gut biome and the spread of breast cancer
 Discovery of an inhibitor protein that is inactive in patients with hard-to-treat “triple negative” breast cancer
 Analysis determining that Black and Asian lung cancer patients wait averages of 5 and 11 days longer than white patients for initiation of radiation therapy, respectively
 Discovery of a form of RNA prevalent in prostate cancers that could serve as a target for treatments

UVA Cancer Center operates the LGL Leukemia Registry, the only national database and specimen bank from patients of the disease. It is a member of the Oncology Research Information Exchange Network (ORIEN), a group of 16 institutions, as well as the Cooperative Human Tissue Network, the Lung Cancer Biospecimen Research Network, and the Applied Proteogenomics and Learning (APOLLO) program.

Patients who receive cancer treatment at UVA can participate in its Partners in Discovery program by consenting to donate tumor tissue from surgeries and information about their health and treatment. Analyses of these specimens and other data is anonymously entered into the nationwide databases to support research, to further the development of personalized medicine, and to expedite access to clinical trials.

Locations 
The UVA Cancer Center is based at UVA Health. Outpatient treatment is provided at the Emily Couric Clinical Cancer Center (ECCCC) in Charlottesville and at satellite clinics in Albemarle and Augusta counties and in Culpeper, Virginia. The ECCCC is a 150,000 square-foot facility built at a cost of $74 million. It was dedicated in 2011 and named for state senator Emily Couric, who died of pancreatic cancer in 2001.

Notable people 
 Thomas P. Loughran Jr.
 Michael J. Weber

References 

Medical research institutes in the United States
University of Virginia
NCI-designated cancer centers
1984 establishments in Virginia
Research institutes in Virginia